Guraleus pictus is a species of sea snail, a marine gastropod mollusk in the family Mangeliidae.

Description
The Guraleus Pictus has a typical shell length of 17mm, variable in size, shape and extent of brown banding.

Distribution
This marine species is endemic to Southern and Eastern Australia and can be found intertidally and subtidally amongst rocks and seaweed off the coasts of New South Wales, Queensland, South Australia, Victoria, Western Australia and Tasmania.

References

 Adams, A. & Angas, G.F. 1864. Descriptions of new species from Australian seas, in the collection of George French Angas. Proceedings of the Zoological Society of London 1863(III): 418–428, pl. xxxvii 
 Tenison-Woods, J.E. 1876. Description of new Tasmanian shells. Papers and Proceedings of the Royal Society of Tasmania 1875: 131–159
 Verco, J.C. 1909. Notes on South Australian marine Mollusca with descriptions of new species. Part XII. Transactions of the Royal Society of South Australia 33: 293–342
  Hedley, C. 1922. A revision of the Australian Turridae. Records of the Australian Museum 13(6): 213–359, pls 42–56 
 May, W.L. 1923. An Illustrated Index of Tasmanian Shells: with 47 plates and 1052 species. Hobart : Government Printer 100 pp. 
 Powell, A.W.B. 1968. The Turrid shellfish of Australian waters. Australian Natural History 1 16: 1–6

External links
  Sowerby, G.B., III. (1896) List of the Pleurotomidae of South Australia, with descriptions of some new species. Proceedings of the Malacological Society of London, 2, 24–32, pl. 3 
  Tucker, J.K. 2004 Catalog of recent and fossil turrids (Mollusca: Gastropoda). Zootaxa 682:1–1295.
 

pictus
Gastropods described in 1864
Gastropods of Australia